Manchester is a city in Northwest England.  The M11 postcode area of the city includes the suburb of Clayton.  This postcode area contains 15 listed buildings that are recorded in the National Heritage List for England.  Of these, two are listed at Grade II*, the middle of the three grades, and the others are at Grade II, the lowest grade.  Most of the listed buildings in the area are associated with the Ashton Canal, which runs through it; these consists of locks, bridges, and a lock keeper's cottage.  The other listed buildings are a former manor house, a bridge in the grounds of the manor house, two churches, and a school.


Key

Buildings

References

Citations

Sources

Lists of listed buildings in Greater Manchester
Buildings and structures in Manchester